Ueckermünde is a railway station in the town of Ueckermünde, Mecklenburg-Vorpommern, Germany. The station lies on the Jatznick–Ueckermünde railway and the train services are operated by Ostseeland Verkehr. The original homonymous terminal station, opened on 15 September 1884, was given up, when the line was extended further northwards into Ueckermünde on 15 August 2009.

Train services
The station is served by the following service:
regional service (Ostseeland Verkehr) Bützow - Neubrandenburg - Pasewalk - Ueckermünde Stadthafen

References
Deutsche Bahn website

Railway stations in Mecklenburg-Western Pomerania
Railway stations in Germany opened in 2009
Buildings and structures in Vorpommern-Greifswald